Marquess Jing of Han (Chinese: 韩景侯; pinyin: Hán Jǐnghóu) (died 400 BC), ancestral name Jì (姬), clan name Hán (韩), personal name Qían (虔), was the ruler of the State of Han between 408 BC until his death in 400 BC. Marquess Jing was the son of Wuzi of Han. It was during his rule that the State of Han became a recognized state. In the first year of his reign, he attacked the State of Zheng and took over Yongqiu in today's Qi County, Henan. The next year, his army lost to Zheng at Fushu in today's Dengfeng, Henan. In 403 BC, Marquess Jing, along with Marquess Wen of Wei and Marquess Lie of Zhao partitioned the powerful Jin state into the Han, Wei, and Zhao states marking the beginning of the Warring States Period and Han as an independent polity. King Weilie of Zhou was forced to elevate Jing's title from viscount to marquess. Marquess Jing then moved the capital of Han from Pingyang to Yangzhai. In 400 BC, the capital Yangzhai was subject to a siege by the Zheng army. Marquess Jing died later that year and was succeeded by his son Marquess Lie of Han.

Ancestors

References

Shiji Chapter 45
Zizhi Tongjian Volume 1

400 BC deaths
Zhou dynasty nobility
Monarchs of Han (state)
Year of birth unknown
Founding monarchs